Achibakh or Achibakhi is a mountain in Abkhazia. Height 2376 m. The highest peak of the plateau Rykhva. On the map of Abkhazia, issued in 2009 by the Geographical Society of Abkhazia, the mountain is called Arttara.

Geography 
The limestone mountain rises above the karst fields, in which there are many caves. One of the largest caves is the Quartet mine (-340 m).
The highest point in the vicinity is Mount Agepsta northwest of mountain Achibakhi.

Flora 
Mixed forest and subalpine (tree line) endemic flora grows on the mountain.

See also

References

Mountains of Abkhazia